The Hawaiian Division was a division of the United States Army, dedicated to the defense of Hawaii. This division was named rather than numbered, as were the Philippine, Panama Canal and Americal Divisions. It was first activated under the peacetime Square Division Table of Organization and Equipment (TO&E) on 25 February 1921 as the Hawaiian Division using assets of the World War I era 11th Infantry Division. It, the Philippine Division, and the Americal Division were the last three U.S. Army divisions to be named rather than numbered. Joseph E. Kuhn, then in command of Schofield Barracks, oversaw the initial organization and employment of the division.

The division retained the square division TO&E until 1941, when it was reorganized under a triangular division TO&E, and part of its former organization became the core of the new 24th Infantry Division and 25th Infantry Division.
It included the 21st and 22nd Infantry Brigades, and the 19th, 21st, 27th, and 35th Infantry Regiments.

World War II
The 24th and 25th Infantry Divisions were among the first to see combat in World War II and among the last to stop fighting. The Divisions were on Oahu, with headquarters at Schofield Barracks, when the Japanese bombed Pearl Harbor on 7 December 1941 and suffered minor casualties. Charged with the defense of Oahu and the Hawaiian Islands, they built an elaborate system of coastal defenses before deploying for further combat operations.

Inactivation
The Hawaiian Division was inactivated in October 1941 to provide cadre and units for the 24th and 25th Infantry Divisions. These were triangular divisions with regiments of the Hawaii National Guard providing the third regiment of each division. The 299th Regiment went to the 24th and the 298th Regiment went to the 25th Infantry Division. The 24th Infantry Division retained the Hawaiian Division Green Taro Leaf Shoulder Patch for wear.

Lineage
Constituted 1 February 1921 in the Regular Army as Headquarters, Hawaiian Division
Activated 1 March 1921 at Schofield Barracks, Hawaii
Inactivated 1 October 1941 at Schofield Barracks

Commanders

See also
Formations of the United States Army

References

Sources
 U.S. Army Order of Battle 1919–1941, Volume 1. The Arms: Major Commands and Infantry Organizations, 1919–41 by Lieutenant Colonel (Retired) Steven E. Clay, Combat Studies Institute Press, Fort Leavenworth, KS, 2011

External links
24th Infantry Division Home Page – official site.
24th Infantry Division Association
The 24th Infantry Division in Europe
GlobalSecurity.org: 24th Infantry Division
25th Infantry Division Home Page  – official site.
Lineage and Honors of the 25th Infantry Division Headquarters and Headquarters Battalion 
GlobalSecurity.org: 25th Infantry Division (Light)
25th Infantry Division Association
35th Infantry Regiment before WW2
The 11th Field Artillery brigade passes in review, June 24th, 1921
COA at 

H
Infantry divisions of the United States Army
Military units and formations established in 1921
1921 establishments in Hawaii
1941 disestablishments in Hawaii
Military units and formations disestablished in 1941